"I'm Good" is a song written and performed by American rap duo Clipse featuring fellow American rapper Pharrell Williams from the duo's third studio album Til the Casket Drops (2009). Produced by The Neptunes (Williams & Chad Hugo), the cover artwork is made by KAWS who also made the cover artwork for Clipse's previous single Kinda Like a Big Deal. It was released on iTunes on June 30, 2009. The single sold nearly 7,700 copies in first week.

Music video
The music videos for "I'm Good" (directed by Dayo) as well as "All Eyes On Me" featuring Keri Hilson were shot in late June 2009 in Los Angeles. It ranked at #27 on BET's Notarized Top 100 Videos of 2009 countdown.

Remix
The official remix has new verses by Clipse and features rappers Rick Ross and Pharrell Williams. It was released on the internet and New York radio station Hot 97 by DJ Envy on October 19, 2009. The music video of the remix was released on November 3, 2009. The remix originally leaked on the internet and mixtapes on October 12, 2009, with Clipse's verses from the original version and Ross' verse for the remix.

Charts

References

2009 singles
2009 songs
Clipse songs
Pharrell Williams songs
Columbia Records singles
Song recordings produced by the Neptunes
Songs written by Pharrell Williams
Songs written by Pusha T